Isohaara is the ninth studio album by the Finnish rock group CMX. The album is named after Isohaara power plant in Keminmaa. The band spent six months in the studio because of the chosen songwriting method: the songs were written and rehearsed at the studio under constant perfecting and re-arranging. Musically the album is lighter and more accessible than its predecessor, the over 100-minute Prog-epoch Dinosaurus Stereophonicus.

Track listing
All songs written and arranged by CMX with lyrics by A. W. Yrjänä.

 "Päänsärkijä" – 4:31  "Headbreaker" 
 "Pohjoista leveyttä" – 3:20  "Northern Latitude" 
 "Veitsenterä" – 4:33  "Knife's Blade" 
 "Minne paha haudattiin" – 5:31  "Where Evil Was Buried" 
 "Isohaara" – 3:39 
 "Revontulten repijä" – 6:13  "Ripper of Aurora Borealis" 
 "Minun sydämeni on särkynyt" – 3:58  "My Heart is Broken" 
 "Post mortem" – 2:55
 "Lihan syvyyksiin" – 3:51  "Into the Depths of Flesh" 
 "Silmien takana" – 4:05  "Behind the Eyes" 
 "Tuulilukko" – 4:24  "Windlock"

Personnel
 A. W. Yrjänä - Vocals, bass guitar, harmonica, harmonium
 Janne Halmkrona - Guitar, keyboards
 Timo Rasio - Guitar
 Tuomas Peippo - Drums

Guests
 Music class 4C of the Suutarila elementary school - Choir on #5
 Ismo Rajaniemi - Choir conductor on #5

Technical
 Gabi Hakanen - Producing, recording and mixing
 Illusion Rake - Piano (Track 6), Recording and mixing of vocals and co-production on #4
 Mika Jussila - Mastering

Singles
 "Pohjoista leveyttä" (June 2002)
 Exclusive B-sides: "Kolme kimaltavaa neitoa" and "Väkivallan moottorit"
 "Minun sydämeni on särkynyt" (July 2002)
 Exclusive B-sides: "Epäluoma" and "Helevetinkone"
 "Minne paha haudattiin" (October 2002)
 Exclusive B-sides: "Ehdota jotain parempaa" and "Kvartetto rock-yhtyeelle ja solistille, op. 1"
 "Silmien takana" (promosingle, January 2003)

CMX (band) albums
2002 albums